Dennis Michael Gibson (born February 8, 1964 in Des Moines, Iowa) is a former American football linebacker who played in the National Football League from 1987-1995 for the Detroit Lions and the San Diego Chargers. Perhaps his most memorable moment came in the 1994 AFC Championship Game, when he sent the Chargers to the Super Bowl by lunging to block a 4th down pass attempt from Pittsburgh Steelers quarterback Neil O'Donnell in the end zone to win the game.

Uptown Food and Beverage 
Dennis Gibson used to own a pizza place in Johnston, Iowa called Encore Pizza (formerly known as the Pizza Oven).

He now owns a restaurant in Ankeny, Iowa called Uptown Food and Beverage.

References 

1964 births
Living people
Players of American football from Des Moines, Iowa
American football linebackers
Iowa State Cyclones football players
Detroit Lions players
San Diego Chargers players